Omoro may refer to:

 Omoro Botanical Garden in Okinawa, Japan
 Omoro District in the Northern Region of Uganda
 Omoro Lake in Bolivia
 Omoro-machi, a neighborhood of Naha, Okinawa, Japan
 Omoro Sōshi, a compilation of ancient poems and songs from Okinawa and the Amami Islands